Hamdy Alaa (born 1 October  2000) is an Egyptian professional footballer who plays as a midfielder for Egyptian Premier League club Zamalek.

References

Egyptian footballers
Living people
2000 births
Zamalek SC players